Calbia is a fictional country found in the Doc Savage novel The King Maker (1934).

Calbia is a small Balkan nation in southeastern Europe.  It lies on the Adriatic Sea and is bordered by Greece, Albania, Macedonia, Serbia, and Montenegro.  There are farmlands in the valleys and some flatlands.  Otherwise it is heavily forested, usually with firs, and mountainous.  The nation is largely undeveloped, though not a poor nation.  One section of Calbia is rich in petroleum fields and dotted with oil wells.  Asphalt roads, air fields, and development derived from this petroleum money were spreading throughout the nation in the 1930s. 

Calbia had an army, air force, and nascent navy.

The capital of Calbia is San Blazna.  The city streets are generally narrow, walled in by a profusion of houses built over the centuries.  San Blazna lies on the River Carlos, named after the founder of the royal dynasty of Calbia, which is crossed by two large bridges.  In the center of San Blazna on the left bank of the River Carlos is an ancient castle which serves as the king's palace.  In medieval times the river was diverted into a moat around the castle.  This moat is surrounded by a large esplanade which serves as the main promenade of the capital.  In one part of town is an ancient stone house, now a national museum, which was the peasant home of the first King Le Galbin.  Out the very outskirts of the capital is an old graystone citadel, a simple structure of one domed tower complete with subterranean dungeons, which was constructed by the first king of Calbia perhaps for defensive military reasons.

The Calbian language is a dialect of Slavic-romance languages, the latter probably due to its proximity to Italy.

Calbia is a kingdom, ruled by a dynastic monarchy.  The King of Calbia in 1934 at the time of The King Maker is Dal Le Galbin.  However, the nation was forward thinking and had progressive political movements such as democratic parties and a Calbia National Women's Suffrage League.

Researcher Thomas Fortenberry has suggested that Calbia is the model for another fictional country, Latveria found in the Marvel Universe.  The action of The King Maker may also form the basis for the Marvel Comics supervillain character Doctor Doom, especially when combined with another Doc Savage villain, John Sunlight.  Furthermore, Fortenberry contends that The King Maker is the origin of the fictional nation of Novenia, found in the Prince Zarkon series by Lin Carter.  This series was a self-admitted pastiche in honor of Doc Savage.

Fictional European countries
Doc Savage
Eastern Europe in fiction
Fictional kingdoms